Kapingamarangi is a Polynesian language spoken in the Federated States of Micronesia. It had 3,000 native speakers in 1995. The language is closely related to the Nukuoro language.

Introduction

History
The Kapingamarangi language is a language spoken on islands in the Pacific Ocean by people from Kapingamarangi, the Pohnpei Island, and in the Pohnrakied village in Pohnpei. A small number of Kapingamarangi speakers are also found on other nearby islands, or in communities around the world to which they have immigrated. Kapingamarangi was first recorded on an expedition in 1557 by Spanish navigator . Kapingamarangi, also known as Kirinit, is categorized in the Austronesian language family, along with many other Pacific languages. The Kapingamarangi language is spoken not only on the atoll of Kapingamarangi, but also in the village of Pohnrakied, located on the island of Pohnpei.

Population
Kapingamarangi currently has three thousand total speakers: one thousand speakers on the atoll of Kapingamarangi and two thousand speakers in Pohnrakied village on Pohnpei. The people of Kapingamarangi are considered by Lieber and Dikepa to be of Polynesian ethnicity; the other seven states of the Federated States of Micronesia are categorized as being Micronesian. The language status of Kapingamarangi is "educational", which means that the language is in vigorous use, maintaining standardization and literature throughout a widespread system in institutions of education. The language has been developed to a point that it is used and sustained in people's homes and around the community.

Alphabet
A, B, D, E, G, H, I, K, L, M, N, Ng, O, P, T, U, W

Long vowels are written with double vowels. The Lieber-Dikepa lexicon also uses double consonants to represent the aspirated consonants in certain cases, namely nasals (where doubled ng is nng), w, h, and l.

Phonology

Consonants

Vowels
In the Kapingamarangi language, the vowels can be described as long or short vowels. A long vowel means that the vowel sound is stressed more in a word when spoken and held out for longer. The long vowels are written by writing two of the same letters next to each other. Therefore, the Kapingamarangi language is composed of ten vowels. 

ex.  'bird'
 'small' or 'little'

Kapingamarangi vowel phonemes have diphthongs because in Kapingamarangi language, it is possible to have any two vowels next to each other.

Syllable structure
The syllable structure of the Kapingamarangi language is VV, VVV, VCV, CVV, CCVV, CVCV, and CCVCV. In Kapingamarangi, like most Polynesian languages, it is impossible for a word to end in a consonant, but it is possible for there to be two consonants together, as long as it is the same letter.

In this term, the two (W's) stand together in the word .

Grammar

Basic word order
There are three possible word orders in the Kapingamarangi language. The word order of Kapingamarangi is SVO (subject–verb–object), VSO (Verb Subject Object), or OSV (Object Verb Subject). SVO is the commonly used word order, followed by VSO, and finally OSV is the least used and is a very case in the language. The word order for questions is the same as they are for statements. In research for the grammar of Kapingamarangi, deciphering reasoning or specific uses for the alternative word orders are unsure.

ex. Mee gu noho I dono hale.
He is staying at the house.

Morphology
Morphology is another pivotal element to understanding the grammar of Kapingamarangi. Morphology is the descriptive analysis of words. The morphology of Kapingamarangi is extremely extensive. The word classes in Kapingamarangi are pronouns, possessives, demonstratives, verbs, nouns, adverbs, adjectives, negatives, particles, conjunctions, and interjections.

Many verbs can take a prefix, but even more verbs take a suffix. For example, a verb may have a prefix like haka- before a word, and a suffix like –ina after a word. Like the French language, adjectives follow nouns; and adverbs follow verbs, adjectives, and/or demonstratives. Negatives in Kapingamarangi immediately precede verbs or verb particles. Conjunctions mark serial relationships, and interjections denote emotion.

The pronouns in Kapingamarangi can be dual (two people), plural (more than two people), inclusive (including the addressee), or exclusive (excluding the addressee). Serial relationships are expressed by the pronoun mo, which means "and". For example, "David and I" would be, "Kimaua mo David". The pronouns in the Kapingamarangi language are very different from the pronouns in the English language. The pronouns in Kapingamarangi are not gender specific. For example, Kinae means "him or her"; therefore the gender must be translated through the context of a sentence or conversation.

Reduplication
Reduplication is a common concept that appears in the Kapingamarangi language, and is relevant to understanding the grammar of Kapingamarangi. Reduplication is the repetition of a root word. The reduplication of Kapingamarangi can be achieved in two different fashions: partial and full reduplication. The fully reduplicated form is generated by the full repetition of the base form, while partial reduplication is generated by partial repetition of the base form. Reduplication usually depicts continued or repeated action. For example, tapa is a single flash of lightning, while tapatapa is repeated flashing. In Kapingamarangi, reduplication can be done with the first two syllables, or it can be done with the final two syllables. There is only one word in the lexicon of Kapingamarangi that displays a partially reduplicated form; the word baba is the only word that is partially reduplicated, and it reduplicates to the word babaa.

Examples:
 Tapa – single flash of lightning
 Tapatapa – repeated flashing
 Uii – pick fruit 
 Uuii – pick a bunch of fruits
 Waa – roar 
 Waawaa – repeated roaring
 Mahi – strength, power, energy 
 Mahimahi – hard to pull out

Endangerment

Materials
Kapingamarangi has access to many different materials. One of the materials that the Kapingamarangi language has access to is an online talking dictionary. It is a dictionary where one can enter a word in English and it will automatically translate it to Kapingamarangi. Many words in this dictionary also have a vocal response on how to pronounce the word, which is why it is called a talking dictionary. This is a resource because it not only provides visual correlations between the English and Kapinga translation for a word, but it also has vocal responses so that scholars of Kapingamarangi can hear a word and how to correctly pronounce it. A Kapingamarangi lexicon has also been published by Michael D. Lieber and Kalio H. Dikepa.

Kapingamarangi also has access to a variety of books, including dictionaries, books that contain linguistic information, and even books about the atoll of Kapingamarangi. Many native speakers were involved in the translation project that resulted in the Kapingamarangi Bible. These are resources because they are full of information and are highly reliable. Websites like Facebook and YouTube also contain information on Kapingamarangi. The Facebook page is a Micronesia Language Revitalization Workshop page and it contains information about a workshop that was held all throughout Micronesia, including Kapingamarangi. There is a YouTube video of an interview with a speaker who is bilingual in both English and Kapinga and he explains the importance of speaking Kapingamarangi and language revitalization (Heinrich, 2013). There are also selections of poetry in Kapingamarangi.

Intergenerational transmission 

It is likely that Kapingamarangi is being transmitted to children, because attempts to revitalize Kapingamarangi are being carried out, and the number of speakers keeps increasing. Since the language is taught in schools, it can be assumed that language is being passed down to the next generation. Since Kapingamarangi has so many resources for people to go to, children have access to a variety of resources to assist their education of the language. Kapingamarangi is not endangered, however it is threatened. The language is taught in schools and churches, but is not used in all domains. According to Ethnologue, Kapingamarangi is taught in primary schools. It is also used at home, in the community, and in churches. The language is at a current growing state, and might become a  language in the near future.

See also
 Nukuoro language
 Polynesian outlier
 Polynesian languages
 Tokelauan language

References

Further reading 
 Anderson, Gregory D.S. and K. David Harrison (2013). Kapingamarangi Talking Dictionary. Living Tongues Institute for Endangered Languages. http://www.talkingdictionary.org/kapingamarangi
 Elbert, S. (1946). Kapingamarangi and Nukuoro Word List, With Notes on Linguistic Position, Pronunciation, and Grammar. United States: United States Military Government

External links 

 Alphabet and pronunciation
 "It's our Bible" video, told in Kapingamarangi.
 Kapingamarangi at Ethnologue.
 Kaipuleohone has archived collections with Kapingamarangi materials including a Kapingamarangi lexical database, and digitized index cards of plant and animal names.
 Glosbe dictionary kapingamarangi - spanish spanish - kapingamarangi

Ellicean languages
Languages of the Federated States of Micronesia
Endangered Austronesian languages
Severely endangered languages